
The 100-man kumite (Japanese: hyakunin kumite) is an extreme test of physical and mental endurance in Kyokushin karate. Kumite is a form of sparring, one of the three main sections of karate training, and involves simulated combat against an opponent. The 100-man kumite consists of 100 rounds of kumite, each between one-and-a-half and two minutes in length. Normally, the karate practitioner undergoing the test will have to face similarly or higher-ranked opponents, and may face the same opponent more than once in the course of the test (depending on the number of opponents available to participate).  Each opponent faced will be fresh and not fatigued or injured. Each of the rounds are done under test conditions, where either of the fighters are allowed to deliver knock out blows.

The challenge was devised by Masutatsu Oyama, the founder of Kyokushin and the first person to complete the test. He completed the 100-man kumite three times over three consecutive days. The second man to complete the test was Steve Arneil in 1965. In July 2004, a woman named Naomi Ali completed the 100-man kumite. Today it is considered a normal grading requirement to go through 20 to 40 rounds of Kumite when attempting Dan grades.

List of kumites
 Masutatsu Oyama (Japan) (No Proof)
 Steve Arneil (UK/South Africa, May 21, 1965)
 Tadashi Nakamura (Japan, October 15, 1965)
 Shigeru Oyama (Japan, September 17, 1966) (120 in total)
 Loek Hollander (The Netherlands, August 5, 1967)
 John Jarvis (New Zealand, 1967)
 Howard Collins (United Kingdom, December 1, 1972)
 Miyuki Miura (Japan, April 13, 1973)
 Shokei Matsui (Japan, April 18, 1986)
 Ademir da Costa (Brazil, April 25, 1987)
 Keiji Sampei (Japan, February 24, 1990)
 Akira Masuda (Japan, May 19, 1991)
 Kenji Yamaki (Japan, March 22, 1995)
 Marius Schoeman (South Africa, March 23, 1996)
 Francisco Filho (Brazil, March 22, 1999)
 Hajime Kazumi (Japan, March 13, 1999)
Pedro Luis Beltrán Goju Nin Kumite, 50 Kumites (Spain, May 17, 2001) (only person who has performed the test at 50 years of age)
 Klaus Rex (Spain, December 12, 2002)
 Naomi Ali (Australia, July 4, 2004) 
Víctor Flores (Argentina, December 8, 2004)
Juan Manuel Gallego (Spain, 21 January 2006)
César Rufo Silvestre (Spain, 3 December 2006)
 Arthur Hovhannisyan (March 29, 2009)
 Judd Reid (Thailand/Australia, October 22, 2011)
 Tariel Nikoleishvili (Russia, April 26, 2014)
 Abdullah Tarsha (Saudi Arabia, June 2, 2016)
 Takuma Kouketsu (Japan, November 26, 2017)
 Daniel Sanchez (Spain, March 10, 2018)
Junior Robert McInnes (Japan, May 28, 2018)
 Cem Senol (Netherlands, February 22, 2020)

See also

Karate Combat
Karate at the Summer Olympics
Karate World Championships

References

Full contact karate
Karate
Karate organizations
Martial arts
Kyokushin kaikan